The statue of Martin Luther King Jr. was installed in Mexico City's Parque Lincoln in 1993 by artist Maru Santos.

See also

 Civil rights movement in popular culture
 Memorials to Martin Luther King Jr.

References

External links
 

1993 establishments in Mexico
1993 sculptures
Memorials to Martin Luther King Jr.
Monuments and memorials in Mexico City
Outdoor sculptures in Mexico City
Polanco, Mexico City
Sculptures of Martin Luther King Jr.
Sculptures of men in Mexico
Statues in Mexico City